The ASEAN Schools Sports Council is an apolitical regional sports organization that promotes sports among ASEAN member countries.
This sport organization was formed in 1978 to coordinate 
championship programs and activities in ASEAN countries. In 2008 
the ASSC members agreed to adopt a multi-sport format similar to the Southeast Asian Games (SEA Games) for its competitions, and this gave birth to ASEAN School Games

Objectives 

To promote ASEAN Solidarity in our youth through school sports;
To provide opportunities for school athletes to benchmark their sporting talents in the ASEAN region; and
To provide opportunities for school athletes to interact and engage in cultural exchange within ASEAN.

References

ASEAN School Games
Children's sport